George Bagby (born May 5, 1937) is a Democratic former member of the Wyoming House of Representatives, representing the 15th district since 2003. Bagby was a Committeeman in the Wyoming National Democratic Committee from the years 2000 to 2004. He lost the 2012 elections to Don Burkhart.

Bagby used to be in the United States Army, from which he was Honorably Discharged in 1957.

References

External links
Wyoming State Legislature - Representative George Bagby
Project Vote Smart - Representative George Bagby (WY) profile
Follow the Money - George Bagby
2006 2004 2002 campaign contributions

Democratic Party members of the Wyoming House of Representatives
1937 births
Living people
Politicians from Laramie, Wyoming